Garden Valley (formerly, Johntown) is an unincorporated community in El Dorado County, California.

A post office operated at Garden Valley from 1852 to 1853, from 1854 to 1862, from 1872 to 1895, and from 1896 to present (having moved in 1940). The place was originally called Johntown in honor of the sailor who discovered gold at the site. The name was changed in recognition that marketing vegetables was more lucrative than gold mining.

The population in Garden Valley was 3,929 as of the 2020 census

Education
The Black Oak Mine Unified School District serves Garden Valley.

References

External links 

 Garden Valley Mining Properties Collection, 1934-1938.

Unincorporated communities in California
Unincorporated communities in El Dorado County, California